Rudolf "Rudi" Noack (30 March 1913 – c. 30 June 1947) was a German football player. He played in the 1934 FIFA World Cup, scoring one goal in the tournament against Czechoslovakia in the semi-finals.

World War II 
During World War II Noack was called up and served as a corporal in the German Army with anti-aircraft units stationed mainly in Hamburg, Vienna and in Bohemia (Czechoslovakia) where at the end of the war he was captured by Soviet forces. He died in a prisoner of war camp at Rakitianka near Orsk, Russia, on 30 June 1947.

References

External links 
 

1913 births
1947 deaths
German footballers
Germany international footballers
1934 FIFA World Cup players
Hamburger SV players
First Vienna FC players
German people who died in Soviet detention
Association football forwards
German Army soldiers of World War II
German prisoners of war in World War II held by the Soviet Union
Footballers from Hamburg